The 1981–82 Hellenic Football League season was the 29th in the history of the Hellenic Football League, a football competition in England.

Premier Division

The Premier Division featured 14 clubs which competed in the division last season, along with two new clubs, promoted from Division One:
Clanfield
Wantage Town

League table

Division One

The Division One featured 13 clubs which competed in the division last season, along with 3 new clubs:
Morris Motors, relegated from the Premier Division
Abingdon United, relegated from the Premier Division
Badminton Picksons

League table

References

External links
 Hellenic Football League

1981-82
8